Eduardo Ferreira dos Santos, more commonly known as Eduardo Mancha is a Brazilian football defender, who currently plays for Ventforet Kofu.

Club career

Machine Sazi
He made his debut for Machine Sazi in first fixtures of 2019–20 Iran Pro League against  Esteghlal.

Honours

Club 
Ventforet Kofu
 Emperor's Cup: 2022

References

1995 births
Living people
Brazilian footballers
Persian Gulf Pro League players
Primeira Liga players
Brazilian expatriate sportspeople in Iran
Expatriate footballers in Iran
Expatriate footballers in Portugal
Brazilian expatriate footballers
Association football defenders
Machine Sazi F.C. players
S.C. Farense players
Ventforet Kofu players
J2 League players